This is a list of magistrates of Tainan County:

On 25 December 2010, the county merged with Tainan City to form a larger single special municipality.

See also
 Mayor of Tainan

External links
 Elected mayors - CEC

Tainan County